Ravels is a municipality located in the Belgian province of Antwerp. The municipality comprises the towns of Poppel, Ravels proper and Weelde. In 2021, Ravels had a total population of 15,105. The total area is 94.99 km². A large proportion of its inhabitants are immigrants from The Netherlands.

The town hall and the municipal services are located in Weelde.

References

External links

Official website (Dutch)

 
Municipalities of Antwerp Province
Populated places in Antwerp Province